Tiago Antônio Campagnaro, better known as Tiago (born 2 July 1983 in Campo Largo, Paraná), is a former Brazilian goalkeeper.

Goals 
As of 6 February 2009, he has scored 16 goals in his career.

Honours
Corinthians
Brazilian Série A: 2005

Vasco da Gama
Brazilian Série B: 2009

Ceará
Copa do Nordeste: 2015

Career statistics

Club career

List of goals scored

Following, is the list with the goals scored by Tiago:

References

External links
CBF  
zerozero.pt 
websoccerclub 

netvasco.com.br 
netvasco.com.br statistics 
crvascodagama 

1983 births
Living people
Brazilian footballers
Sportspeople from Paraná (state)
Paraná Clube players
Clube Atlético Juventus players
Sport Club Corinthians Paulista players
Associação Portuguesa de Desportos players
CR Vasco da Gama players
Esporte Clube Bahia players
Grêmio Barueri Futebol players
Ceará Sporting Club players
Avaí FC players
Treze Futebol Clube players
Red Bull Brasil players
Association football goalkeepers